Rifaat El Mahgoub (23 April 1926 – 12 October 1990) was an important Egyptian politician, speaker of the Egyptian Parliament, and a member of the then ruling National Democratic Party.

Early life and education
Mahgoub was born in Damietta on 23 April 1926. He received a law degree from Cairo University in 1949. Then he obtained a PhD in economics from the Sorbonne.

Career
Under Naser's administration, Mahgoub took part in the preparatory committee and also participated in the Socialist Union as an official representing the universities. On 21 November 1959, he was appointed a member of the Socialist Union's Executive Bureau for the Cairo Governorate. In 1962 when he was selected to the membership of the charter preparation committee. In the national congress of 1962 he said: "Those who fear freedom are the fiercest enemies of freedom. Fear of freedom is an unforgivable crime". According to his interview in 1984 his disagreement with Naser's administration was over the freedom of the university. He withdraw from political action in May 1967 and went to Beirut where he worked as a professor at the Arab University of Beirut from 1968 until 1970 in the School of Economics.

Purging the government, political and security establishments of the Nasserists, Anwar al-Sadat invited Mahgoub to take part in the Infitah policy phase and he took a series of teaching positions at Cairo University, eventually becoming dean of the faculty of Economics and Political Sciences in 1971.

On 2 October 1972, he was appointed by then President Anwar al-Sadat minister for presidential affairs. On 25 May 1975, he was appointed chairman of the committee supervising the restructuring of the Socialist Union's organizations, beginning with the bottom bases. Also in 1975, he was appointed deputy prime minister. But later he withdraw from political action again because of the methods of Sadat's administration. In 1977, Mahgoub drafted for Sadat a memorandum entitled "The New Course of the Open-door Intellectual, Political and Economic Policy". Later he had the opportunity to supervise the establishment of the Multi-party system.

After Sadat's assassination at the hands of Islamic militants, Mahgoub was invited to join the new administration. In February 1984, he announced his accession to the National Party and its Parliamentary Committee. In July 1984, he was elected speaker of the Egyptian parliament.

Assassination
On 13 October 1990 el-Mahgoub was shot dead while in his car on the streets of Cairo.

Ahmad Isma'il 'Uthman Saleh, Ahmad Ibrahim al-Sayyid al-Naggar, Shawqi Salama Mustafa Atiya and Mohamed Hassan Tita were all renditioned from Albania to Egypt, with the cooperation of the United States, accused of participating in the assassination, as well as a later plot against the Khan el-Khalili market in Cairo. Their capture and torture were listed as the main reasons for the US embassies bombings in Kenya and Tanzania.

Works 

1. "The Actual Demand" for which he received the Egyptian State Incentive Award in 1963.

2. "Public Finances"

3. "Economic Development in Egypt"

4. "Socialism"

5. "National Sensitivities"

6. "Interest Rate and Balance"

References

1926 births
1990 deaths
Assassinated Egyptian politicians
Deaths by firearm in Egypt
National Democratic Party (Egypt) politicians
People from Damietta
People murdered in Egypt
Speakers of the Parliament of Egypt
Terrorism deaths in Egypt
Vice-presidents of Egypt
20th-century Egyptian people
1990 murders in Egypt